Kwek Wei Meng, Leon (郭伟民) (born 19 August 1996) is a Singaporean basketball player who plays for the Singapore Slingers in the Asean Basketball League (ABL). When he first joined the Singapore Slingers in 2015, he was only aged 19. In the 2016/2017 ABL season, he had a breakout year while leading the Singapore Slingers in scoring among locals. Leon was selected to join the Singapore National Basketball Youth team at the age of 14, and is an active member of the Singapore National Basketball Men's team. Kwek is currently the captain of the Singapore Basketball Men's team.

Club career
Kwek started off his professional career in 2015 when he was only 19 years old. He played for the Singapore Slingers. Kwek was given the title Most Valuable Player and Top Scorer when he competed at the National Basketball League Division 1 in 2014.

International career 
Kwek is the captain of the men's Singapore national basketball team. He is also a member of the Singapore Slingers, whereby he has the most 3 points made by a local in Singapore Slingers History. In 2020, he was awarded Player of the Game, which he played against Taiwan Fubon Braves.

Kwek was the co-captain, alongside Delvin Goh, of the men's 3x3 basketball team for the 2021 Southeast Asian Games, held in Hanoi, Vietnam.

See also 
 FIBA Asia Championship
 Singapore national basketball team

References

1996 births
Living people
Competitors at the 2015 Southeast Asian Games
Competitors at the 2017 Southeast Asian Games
Competitors at the 2019 Southeast Asian Games
Forwards (basketball)
Shooting guards
Singapore Slingers players
Singaporean men's basketball players
Southeast Asian Games bronze medalists for Singapore
Southeast Asian Games medalists in basketball
Singaporean sportspeople of Chinese descent